Nar Kalateh (also Romanized as Nār Kalāteh; also known as Tār Kalāteh) is a village in Daland Rural District, in the Central District of Ramian County, Golestan Province, Iran. At the 2006 census, its population was 593, in 123 families.

References 

Populated places in Ramian County